Mount Gambier is a single-member electoral district for the South Australian House of Assembly. It covers the far south-east corner of the state containing the City of Mount Gambier and District Council of Grant local government areas. It is centred on the city and extinct volcano of Mount Gambier.

History
The electorate was created in the 1936 redistribution, taking effect at the 1938 election, but the name was not used between the 1993 and 2002 elections – the area was covered by the electoral district of Gordon during that time. It was one of the few country electoral districts that had never been held by the Liberal and Country League during the Playmander era. It was held by long-serving independent John Fletcher for the first two decades of its existence. Labor took the electorate at a 1958 by-election, and it was usually a marginal to fairly safe Labor electorate from then until the Liberals won it at the 1975 election on a 15.5 percent swing. Mount Gambier was one of several rural electorates where Labor suffered large swings in that election–13.5 percent in Chaffey and 16.4 percent in Millicent. Labor has only come reasonably close to retaking the seat once since then, in 1982.

The electorate, both in its current incarnation and as Gordon, has a recent history of electing independent MPs. It was held between 2002 and 2010 by Rory McEwen, a former Liberal who won as an independent in Gordon at the 1997 election after losing a preselection battle to succeed longtime Liberal member Harold Allison. While he did not put Labor into office after the 2002 election, he held various ministerial portfolios in the Rann Labor government from nine months after the election until his retirement at the 2010 election.

McEwen was succeeded by another independent, Don Pegler, who narrowly defeated the Liberal candidate on a 0.4 percent two-candidate preferred margin. Pegler was defeated by Liberal candidate Troy Bell at the 2014 election, who also became an independent in 2017.

In the lead up to the 2018 election, a ReachTEL poll of 655 voters in the electorate was conducted on 13 February 2018, a month before the election. The results of the poll unexpectedly showed that Bell, who was running as an independent candidate, would easily retain the electorate after preferences, and was strongly leading with 36 percent of the primary vote. The Liberals were on 28.5 percent (−23.3), Labor was on 13 percent (+2.1), new SA Best was on 11 percent, others were collectively on 6 percent, with the remaining 5 percent undecided. The election results reflected the poll, and Bell was comfortably returned as the member.

Members for Mount Gambier

Election results

Notes

References
 ECSA profile for Mount Gambier: 2018
 ABC profile for Mount Gambier: 2018
 Poll Bludger profile for Mount Gambier: 2018

Electoral districts of South Australia
Limestone Coast
1938 establishments in Australia
1993 disestablishments in Australia
2002 establishments in Australia
Mount Gambier, South Australia
Constituencies established in 1938
Constituencies established in 2002
Constituencies disestablished in 1993